Leucine rich repeat containing 40 (LRRC40) is a protein that in humans is encoded by the LRRC40 gene.

Species distribution 
LRRC40 is conserved throughout all of its orthologs. The entire protein is highly conserved in mammals, while conservation is high within the leucine rich repeats in the rest of the orthologs. Orthologs were found all the way back to the scarlet sea anemone and homologs were found in bacteria and Archaea using BLAST. The following table gives information on the homologs of LRRC40.

Gene 
LRRC40 is located on the negative DNA strand (see Sense (molecular biology)) of chromosome 1 from 70,611,483- 70,671,223. The gene produces a 2958 base pair mRNA. There are 15 predicted exons in the human gene  with four other splice patterns predicted on GeneCards by the Alternative Splice Database.

Gene neighborhood 
LRRC40 is neighbored downstream by LRRC7 (70,225,888 - 70,587,570) on the positive DNA strand and upstream by SRSF11 (70,687,320-70,716,488) on the positive DNA strand.

Gene expression 
LRRC40 is expressed between the 50th and 100th percentile in almost every tissue in the body.

Protein 
While the exact function of the LRRC40 protein is not yet understood, it is believed to participate in protein-protein interactions because it is a member of the leucine rich repeat family of proteins which are known to participate in protein-protein interactions.

Properties 
LRRC40 is a 602 amino acid protein with a molecular weight of 68.254 kDa and an isoelectric point of 6.04. LRRC40 is expected to localize to the nucleus and has no transmembrane domains to anchor it to the nuclear membrane. LRRC40 has many predicted phosphorylation sites. Of the 19 predicted phosphoserine sites, only two are conserved within the orthologs. These two sites are S38 and S391.

Protein structure 
The secondary structure of the protein has a pattern within the leucine repeat regions. Each leucine repeat has a β-sheet and α-helix. The image to the right shows the particular horseshoe-like structure of a protein with many leucine rich repeats. Depending on the area where the LRRs are located, other proteins can bind within the curve of the horseshoe or attach to the outside of the protein.

Protein interactions 
According to Genecards, LRRC40 has 756 possible protein interactions. These interactions are based on results in the Molecular Interaction database which provided two possible protein interactions. The two proteins are described in the table below.

References